Peter Leonhard Braun (born 11 February 1929) is a German writer and radio producer.

Education
1936 – 1947 	Primary and Secondary School (Gymnasium) in Berlin, Matriculation
1949 – 1953	Freie Universität Berlin, Political Economics Diploma thesis: On Sociology of Radio;Bachelor of Economics

Professional development
1953 – 1973	Freelance author and producer in Berlin, Paris (1963) and London 
(1964 & 1965) exclusively for radio features Trensetter for the „Acoustical Film“, interweaving narration and stereo sound to documentary sound sculptures

Important productions
1967: Chickens, first stereophonic feature production in Germany
1968: Catch as catch can (professional wrestling)
1970: 08h15, Operation theatre 3, hip replacement
1971: Hyenas, Plea for a despised predator
1973:	 Bells in Europe
Range of broadcasts in fifteen languages as trendsetters, radio bestsellers and finally, classics of the „acoustical emancipation“.
1974 – 1994	Sender Freies Berlin – SFB, Berlin Head of the Feature Department, Radio Teaching activity of feature department in Africa, Asia, USA, South America 
and Europe until 1994. The Department Radio won 70 awards.

Positions held in the broadcasting industry
1973 – 1995		Organization and management of the International Feature Conference (annual world conference of feature makers)
1979 – 1983		Responsible for radio in the international competition Prix Futura, Berlin
1983 – 1997		Secretary General of Prix Futura Berlin, responsible for Radio and  Television
1988 – 1997		Management of Prix Europa, pan-European Television contest
1997 – 2000		After the merger of the two competitions, Operative Management of the competition under its new name Prix Europa
2000 – present		Treasurer of the Prix Europa and responsible for radio within the competition

Awards
1964		Kurt-Magnus-Price
1969		Stereo-Price for Catch as catch can
1973	        PRIX ITALIA for Bells in Europe
1974		URTNA-Award for Hyenas (Arabian version)
1974		ONDAS-Award for Bells in Europe (Spanish version)

2007        AUDIO LUMINARY AWARD for lifelong merits
		from the Third Coast Festival in Chicago
2012	        AXEL-EGGEBRECHT-EHRENPREIS for lifelong merits
		from the Medienstiftung Leipzig.

External links
Catalog entry in the German National Library
Brief biography

1929 births
Possibly living people
German radio personalities
German radio writers
German radio producers
German male writers
Writers from Berlin